Isaac Anderson  (November 23, 1760October 27, 1838) was a member of the U.S. House of Representatives from Pennsylvania. He documented the history of the Charlestown, PA area.

Biography
Isaac Anderson was born at "Anderson Place" in Charleston Township in the Province of Pennsylvania (in the portion that is now Schuylkill Township), near Valley Forge, the son of Patrick Anderson and grandson of early settler James Anderson.

As a youth he was the carrier of dispatches between the headquarters of the Revolutionary Army under General George Washington at Valley Forge and the Congress, then in session at York, Pennsylvania. He served three terms of service in the American Revolutionary War before reaching the age of eighteen, at which time he became an ensign in the Fifth Battalion of Chester County Militia. He was commissioned on May 24, 1779, as first lieutenant, Fifth Battalion, Sixth Company. He served as justice of the peace in Charlestown Township for several years, and was a member of the Pennsylvania House of Representatives in 1801.

Anderson was elected as a Republican to the Eighth and Ninth Congresses. He was not a candidate for renomination in 1806. He was engaged in agricultural pursuits and sawmilling. He died at "Anderson Place" in 1838. Interment was in the family burying ground across the road from the family home near Valley Forge.

He is the great-grandfather of Gov. Samuel W. Pennypacker and grandfather of Medal of Honor recipient Everett W. Anderson.

References

 Retrieved on 2009-05-21
The Political Graveyard

1760 births
1838 deaths
Members of the Pennsylvania House of Representatives
Pennsylvania militiamen in the American Revolution
Democratic-Republican Party members of the United States House of Representatives from Pennsylvania